Karolyn Grimes (born July 4, 1940) is an American actress. She is best known for her role as Zuzu Bailey in the classic 1946 Frank Capra film It's a Wonderful Life. She also played Debby Brougham in the 1947 film The Bishop's Wife.

Career

Grimes' film debut came when she was 6 months old. She first attracted attention playing Fred MacMurray's daughter in 1945's Pardon My Past. Her most famous role came as ZuZu in It's a Wonderful Life in 1946. The following year she appeared in six pictures, most notably as the daughter of David Niven and Loretta Young in The Bishop's Wife.

In all Grimes starred in 16 motion pictures as a child actor, but it is as ZuZu that she is best remembered. She was honored as a famous Missourian with a star on the Missouri Walk of Fame in Marshfield, Missouri. She also received the city's highest honor, the Edwin P. Hubble Medal of Initiative in 2007 at the annual Marshfield Cherry Blossom Festival.

Personal life

Grimes was born in Hollywood, California. Her father worked as a store manager for Safeway. From an early age her mother took her for all sorts of lessons, training in violin, piano, singing and dance, and took her to auditions. However, when Grimes was 8 her mother's health began to decline. She was suffering from early onset Alzheimer's disease, an aggressive form of the malady. Six years later she died, at the age of 44. Grimes was just 14 years old at the time. Without her mother she was unable to continue in acting. The following year her father was killed in an automobile accident, and Karolyn was an orphan at the age of 15. By ruling of the District Court she was sent from Hollywood to live with her uncle and his wife in Osceola, Missouri. It was a very difficult adjustment for her. Life in rural Missouri was a far cry from life in southern California, and her aunt was strict, mean and unstable. Karolyn adjusted to the changes, and found support from among the townspeople, who were aware of what she was going through. In a few years time she was going off to college in Warrensburg, Missouri at the University of Central Missouri  and became a medical technologist.

For Grimes, the part of ZuZu in It's a Wonderful Life was something that faded into the past with her childhood. She married, had two children, divorced, married again to a man with three children, and then had two more children with her second husband. However, renewed interest in the film in the early 1980s led Jimmy Stewart to wonder what ever had happened to the little girl who had played 'ZuZu'. Grimes was 39 years old by the time Stewart's secretary tracked her down. Married and raising seven children, she had never even seen the picture.

Hardships came with the passing of years, the hardest of which was the loss of her youngest when he took his own life. A few years later her second husband died of cancer. However, her connection to It's a Wonderful Life brought with it encouragement. In the mid-1980s she began receiving cards and letters from fans who loved the movie. Repeated showings on local and cable television each holiday season created a broad base of admirers, and the movie became a perennial holiday favorite. It was after the death of her second husband that she came to appreciate the depth of the film, particularly the deep desperation portrayed by Stewart. The struggles George Bailey faced seemed echoed in the hardships of her own life. She took the movie's message to heart, and came to be a strong advocate for the film. Grimes has been closely tied to the movie, as the character she portrayed uttered one of cinema's most famous lines: "Look, Daddy. Teacher says, 'Every time a bell rings, an angel gets his wings.'" It was a reminder that Clarence had succeeded. He had showed George his value to all those he loved, and in doing so rekindled a thankful heart and a love for life. 

Grimes has been called upon to introduce the film at screenings nationwide, meeting with people and signing autographs for those who had come to love the picture and its portrayal of hope. In the 1990s the Target store chain chose "It's a Wonderful Life" as its marketing theme for Christmas, and contracted with a number of the actors to be store ambassadors. "They reunited the Bailey kids and we went on tour all over the United States," Grimes said. "It was fabulous. I had the best time ever. I didn't realize how much people loved this film. They seemed to just embrace us so much and put us in their hearts."

Through her speaking engagements she met a psychologist who worked at the Benedict House, a homeless shelter in the Bremerton area. Grimes married for the third time and moved to Seattle. She continues to be invited to big-screen showings of It's a Wonderful Life at dinner theaters worldwide, where she is asked to share stories of her memories of Jimmy Stewart, Donna Reed and the making of the picture. In addition she appears annually at the "It's a Wonderful Life" event held in Seneca Falls, New York, the town that inspired Bedford Falls in the film. She also wrote a holiday cookbook with recipes interspersed with pictures and stories of her time on the set of the movie.

Filmography

References

External links

 
 Official site "Karolyn Grimes - Zuzu today"
 On a Wing and a Prayer
Zuzu’s “Wonderful Life”: The Story of Karolyn Grimes
 

Living people
20th-century American actresses
American child actresses
American film actresses
People from Osceola, Missouri
Actresses from Hollywood, Los Angeles
21st-century American women
1940 births